Vestax Corporation was a Japanese musical instrument, turntable and audio equipment firm founded by Hidesato Shiino in 1977. The company started by designing and manufacturing electronic guitars. In the 1980s, Vestax produced multitrack recorders and later moved to making DJ mixers, professional turntables, compact disc players and signal processors. Debt troubles led to the company's bankruptcy at the end of 2014.

History
The Vestax Corporation of Japan began in 1977 as a designer and manufacturer of electronic guitars. In the 1980s Vestax introduced a series of cassette-based multitracks, including the Vestax MR66, to challenge established products from Fostex, Yamaha and Tascam's portastudios.

Competing in the turntable market

During the late 1990s Vestax launched a new flagship range of professional DJ turntables.  The PDX models had higher specifications than the two market leading products from Technics and were priced in direct competition with the Technics SL1210/SL1200.

However, the industry standard Technics SL1210/SL1200 models remained the favourite of DJs worldwide. At the time they were an established brand with a twenty-year head start. There have also been some build quality issues reported throughout 2008 and 2009.

This pattern of events has been replicated by other DJ equipment manufacturers such as Numark, Gemini and Stanton. These turntables have either a higher specification or lower cost, in sheer numbers sold they are still dwarfed by the various versions of the Technics SL-1200 & SL-1210 series.

Expanding range

In 2006, Vestax moved into the burgeoning digital DJ market and released the VCI 100, an all-in-one DJ controller used to control digital DJ software. Its design of jog wheels and a mixer in a single compact frame sparked a revolution in digital DJ hardware, quickly becoming the blueprint for most DJ controllers and helping to re-establish Vestax as a major player in the DJ market. The company has subsequently solidified this position by launching a highly respected range of DJ controllers from low-end consumer models to more highly specced pro versions such as the VCI-380 and VCI-400.

In the 2010s Vestax focused on high-tech musical electronics, creating signal processors, DJ Mixers, professional turntables and Compact Disc players. The company also reduced its range of turntables, but kept the PDX-2000mk2/2300mk2 for mainstream DJ use, and the PDX-2000mk2pro/PDX-2300pro with a new tonearm suspension system for increased skip resistance. In conjunction with DJ Qbert they have also released the QFO and QFO LE models. These turntables have built-in mixers, and a portable turntable/mixer

Debt troubles
In mid-October 2014, many websites reported a speculative piece investigating reports from the Japanese news source "Teikoku News Online", that Vestax was ceasing operations. Retailers in the US closed shop, and there was a lack of representation or new products being revealed at trade shows. On 5 December Vestax started bankruptcy proceedings with a debt of 900 million yen (roughly $7.5 million USD).

Technology

Vestax was the  manufacturer to release a vinyl cutting machine for home vinyl cutting of new mixes / dubplate, in 2001.

Vestax innovated with their turntable using a straight tone arm, which gave greater tracking force; useful for complex DJing maneuvers such as scratching or beat juggling. This has been adopted by virtually all other turntable manufacturers, with the exception of Technics. Some maintain however that the straight arm increases wear upon the record. This is based on the premise that the original 's' shaped tonearm is so designed as to naturally gravitate toward the center of the record. The straight arm will not do this, and so will theoretically drag more as the record rotates, wearing down the grooves. Vestax however have consistently denied this.

Mixers
For many years Vestax had been creating professional mobile DJ style mixers, but in the early 1990s they started creating mixers focusing on the developing Turntablism scene. Two of the first early attempts were the Vestax PMC-05FX and PMC-05 Trix mixers. These were simple mixers which were endorsed by famous DJs and had a stripped down layout. They had features (like a centered crossfader which was replaceable). They were also a small size which made juggling and other techniques easier. But they lacked some key features like a smooth crossfader, hamster switch, EQ controls, and an unobstructed crossfader area. During NAMM 1993 Vestax began talking to DJs (including DJ Shortkut, DJ Rhettmatic, and DJ Q-Bert) about creating mixers which took some of the best features from previous models and catered to the emerging turntablism scene. The PMC-05 Pro was the first model which came out of these conversations. It was a major step forward for DJs competing in DJ battles. It had a smooth, quick cut crossfader which was adjustable. The crossfader was also not surrounded by any screws or physical barriers, which made scratching and juggling easier. Other features included headphone cueing, 2 band EQs, and independent gains per channel.

Mixer Models

 PMC-05 Series 
 PMC-05Pro
 PMC-05Pro Limited Edition
 PMC-05ProII
 PMC-05ProD Samurai
 PMC-05ProQ
 PMC-05ProIII
 PMC-05ProSL
 PMC-05ProIIIVCA
 PMC-05ProSLVCA
 PMC-05ProIIIDX
 PMC-05ProIV
 PMC-06 Series
 PMC-06T
 PMC-06Pro
 PMC-06ProA
 PMC-06ProD Samurai
 PMC-06ProVCA
 PMC-07 Series
 PMC-07Pro
 PMC-07ProISP
 PMC-07ProD Samurai
 PMC-007
 PMC-37 Pro
 PMC-50 Series
 PMC-50
 PMC-50A
 PMC-55
 PMC-500
 PMC-580Pro
 PCV Series
 PCV-002
 PCV-150
 PCV-175
 PCV-175R (rotary version)
 PCV-180
 PCV-275
 PCV-275R (rotary version)

Influence

Vestax focused on the needs of nightclubs and Disc jockeys and their DJ mixers became favourites of international DJs such as Carl Cox, Jeff Mills, DJ QBert and Cut Chemist. Mixers such as the various iterations of the PMC-05pro have become staples of the Hip Hop DJ community, and they also have manufactured signature models for DJ's such as Carl Cox and DJ Qbert.

See also
 List of phonograph manufacturers

References

External links

Hidesato Shiino Interview NAMM Oral History Library (2011)

Phonograph manufacturers
Japanese brands
Manufacturing companies based in Tokyo
Musical instrument manufacturing companies of Japan
Audio equipment manufacturers of Japan
DJ equipment
1977 establishments in Japan
Electronics companies established in 1977
Defunct companies of Japan